In probability theory, a probability space or a probability triple  is a mathematical construct that provides a formal model of a random process or "experiment". For example, one can define a probability space which models the throwing of a die.

A probability space consists of three elements:
 A sample space, which is the set of all possible outcomes.
 An event space, which is a set of events, an event being a set of outcomes in the sample space.
 A probability function, which assigns each event in the event space a probability, which is a number between 0 and 1.

In order to provide a sensible model of probability, these elements must satisfy a number of axioms, detailed in this article.

In the example of the throw of a standard die, we would take the sample space to be .

When an experiment is conducted, we imagine that "nature" "selects" a single outcome, from the sample space . All the events in the event space  that contain the selected outcome  are said to "have occurred". This "selection" happens in such a way that if the experiment were repeated many times, the number of occurrences of each event, as a fraction of the total number of experiments, would most likely tend towards the probability assigned to that event by the probability function .

The Soviet mathematician Andrey Kolmogorov introduced the notion of probability space, together with other axioms of probability, in the 1930s. In modern probability theory there are a number of alternative approaches for axiomatization — for example, algebra of random variables.

Introduction

A probability space is a mathematical triplet  that presents a model for a particular class of real-world situations.

 The sample space   is the set of all possible outcomes. An outcome is the result of a single execution of the model. Outcomes may be states of nature, possibilities, experimental results and the like. Every instance of the real-world situation (or run of the experiment) must produce exactly one outcome. If outcomes of different runs of an experiment differ in any way that matters, they are distinct outcomes. Which differences matter depends on the kind of analysis we want to do. This leads to different choices of sample space.
 The σ-algebra  is a collection of all the events we would like to consider. This collection may or may not include each of the elementary events.  Here, an "event" is a set of zero or more outcomes; that is, a subset of the sample space. An event is considered to have "happened" during an experiment when the outcome of the latter is an element of the event. Since the same outcome may be a member of many events, it is possible for many events to have happened given a single outcome. For example, when the trial consists of throwing two dice, the set of all outcomes with a sum of 7 pips may constitute an event, whereas outcomes with an odd number of pips may constitute another event. If the outcome is the element of the elementary event of two pips on the first die and five on the second, then both of the events, "7 pips" and "odd number of pips", are said to have happened.
 The probability measure  is a set function returning an event's probability. A probability is a real number between zero (impossible events have probability zero, though probability-zero events are not necessarily impossible) and one (the event happens almost surely, with almost total certainty). Thus  is a function  The probability measure function must satisfy two simple requirements: First, the probability of a countable union of mutually exclusive events must be equal to the countable sum of the probabilities of each of these events. Second, the probability of the sample space  must be equal to 1 (which accounts for the fact that, given an execution of the model, some outcome must occur).

Not every subset of the sample space  must necessarily be considered an event: some of the subsets are simply not of interest, others cannot be "measured". This is not so obvious in a case like a coin toss. In a different example, one could consider javelin throw lengths, where the events typically are intervals like "between 60 and 65 meters" and unions of such intervals, but not sets like the "irrational numbers between 60 and 65 meters".

Definition
In short, a probability space is a measure space such that the measure of the whole space is equal to one.

The expanded definition is the following: a probability space is a triple  consisting of:
 the sample space  — an arbitrary non-empty set,
  contains the sample space: ,
  is closed under complements: if , then also ,
 the probability measure  — a function on  such that:
 P is countably additive (also called σ-additive): if  is a countable collection of pairwise disjoint sets, then 
 the measure of entire sample space is equal to one: .

Discrete case

Discrete probability theory needs only at most countable sample spaces . All subsets of  can be treated as events (thus,  is the power set). The probability measure takes the simple form

The greatest σ-algebra  describes the complete information. In general, a σ-algebra  corresponds to a finite or countable partition , the general form of an event  being . See also the examples.

The case  is permitted by the definition, but rarely used, since such  can safely be excluded from the sample space.

General case

They are an at most countable (maybe empty) set, whose probability is the sum of probabilities of all atoms. If this sum is equal to 1 then all other points can safely be excluded from the sample space, returning us to the discrete case. Otherwise, if the sum of probabilities of all atoms is between 0 and 1, then the probability space decomposes into a discrete (atomic) part (maybe empty) and a non-atomic part.

Non-atomic case

If  for all  (in this case, Ω must be uncountable, because otherwise  could not be satisfied), then equation fails: the probability of a set is not necessarily the sum over the probabilities of its elements, as summation is only defined for countable numbers of elements. This makes the probability space theory much more technical. A formulation stronger than summation, measure theory is applicable. Initially the probabilities are ascribed to some "generator" sets (see the examples). Then a limiting procedure allows assigning probabilities to sets that are limits of sequences of generator sets, or limits of limits, and so on. All these sets are the σ-algebra . For technical details see Carathéodory's extension theorem. In general they are much more complicated than generator sets, but much better than non-measurable sets.

Complete probability space

Often, the study of probability spaces is restricted to complete probability spaces.

Examples

Discrete examples

Example 1
If the experiment consists of just one flip of a fair coin, then the outcome is either heads or tails: .

Example 2
The fair coin is tossed three times. There are 8 possible outcomes:  (here "HTH" for example means that first time the coin landed heads, the second time tails, and the last time heads again). The complete information is described by the σ-algebra  of  events, where each of the events is a subset of Ω.

Alice knows the outcome of the second toss only. Thus her incomplete information is described by the partition , where ⊔ is the disjoint union, and the corresponding σ-algebra . Bryan knows only the total number of tails. His partition contains four parts: ; accordingly, his σ-algebra  contains 24 = 16 events.

The two σ-algebras are incomparable: neither  nor ; both are sub-σ-algebras of 2Ω.

Example 3
If 100 voters are to be drawn randomly from among all voters in California and asked whom they will vote for governor, then the set of all sequences of 100 Californian voters would be the sample space Ω. We assume that sampling without replacement is used: only sequences of 100 different voters are allowed. For simplicity an ordered sample is considered, that is a sequence {Alice, Bryan} is different from {Bryan, Alice}. We also take for granted that each potential voter knows exactly his/her future choice, that is he/she doesn’t choose randomly.

Alice knows only whether or not Arnold Schwarzenegger has received at least 60 votes. Her incomplete information is described by the σ-algebra  that contains: (1) the set of all sequences in Ω where at least 60 people vote for Schwarzenegger; (2) the set of all sequences where fewer than 60 vote for Schwarzenegger; (3) the whole sample space Ω; and (4) the empty set ∅.

Bryan knows the exact number of voters who are going to vote for Schwarzenegger. His incomplete information is described by the corresponding partition  and the σ-algebra  consists of 2101 events.

In this case Alice’s σ-algebra is a subset of Bryan’s: . Bryan’s σ-algebra is in turn a subset of the much larger "complete information" σ-algebra 2Ω consisting of  events, where n is the number of all potential voters in California.

Non-atomic examples

Example 4
A number between 0 and 1 is chosen at random, uniformly. Here Ω = [0,1],  is the σ-algebra of Borel sets on Ω, and P is the Lebesgue measure on [0,1].

In this case the open intervals of the form , where , could be taken as the generator sets.

Example 5
A fair coin is tossed endlessly. Here one can take Ω = {0,1}∞, the set of all infinite sequences of numbers 0 and 1. Cylinder sets  may be used as the generator sets. Each such set describes an event in which the first n tosses have resulted in a fixed sequence , and the rest of the sequence may be arbitrary. Each such event can be naturally given the probability of 2−n.

These two non-atomic examples are closely related: a sequence  leads to the number . This is not a one-to-one correspondence between {0,1}∞ and [0,1] however: it is an isomorphism modulo zero, which allows for treating the two probability spaces as two forms of the same probability space. In fact, all non-pathological non-atomic probability spaces are the same in this sense. They are so-called standard probability spaces. Basic applications of probability spaces are insensitive to standardness. However, non-discrete conditioning is easy and natural on standard probability spaces, otherwise it becomes obscure.

Related concepts

Probability distribution
Any probability distribution defines a probability measure.

Random variables
A random variable X is a measurable function X: Ω → S from the sample space Ω to another measurable space S called the state space.

Defining the events in terms of the sample space
If Ω is countable we almost always define  as the power set of Ω, i.e.  which is trivially a σ-algebra and the biggest one we can create using Ω. We can therefore omit  and just write (Ω,P) to define the probability space.

On the other hand, if Ω is uncountable and we use  we get into trouble defining our probability measure P because  is too "large", i.e. there will often be sets to which it will be impossible to assign a unique measure. In this case, we have to use a smaller σ-algebra , for example the Borel algebra of  Ω, which is the smallest σ-algebra that makes all open sets measurable.

Conditional probability
Kolmogorov’s definition of probability spaces gives rise to the natural concept of conditional probability.  Every set  with non-zero probability (that is) defines another probability measure

on the space. This is usually pronounced as the "probability of B given A".

Independence
Two events, A and B are said to be independent if .

Mutual exclusivity
This is a stronger condition than the probability of their intersection being zero.

This extends to a (finite or countably infinite) sequence of events. However, the probability of the union of an uncountable set of events is not the sum of their probabilities. For example, if  is a normally distributed random variable, then  is 0 for any , but .

The event  is referred to as "A and B", and the event  as "A or B".

See also
 Space (mathematics)
 Measure space
 Fuzzy measure theory
 Filtered probability space
 Talagrand's concentration inequality

References

Bibliography

 Pierre Simon de Laplace (1812) Analytical Theory of Probability
 The first major treatise blending calculus with probability theory, originally in French: Théorie Analytique des Probabilités.
Andrei Nikolajevich Kolmogorov (1950) Foundations of the Theory of Probability
 The modern measure-theoretic foundation of probability theory; the original German version (Grundbegriffe der Wahrscheinlichkeitrechnung) appeared in 1933.
 Harold Jeffreys (1939) The Theory of Probability
 An empiricist, Bayesian approach to the foundations of probability theory.
 Edward Nelson (1987) Radically Elementary Probability Theory
 Foundations of probability theory based on nonstandard analysis. Downloadable. http://www.math.princeton.edu/~nelson/books.html
 Patrick Billingsley: Probability and Measure, John Wiley and Sons,  New York, Toronto, London, 1979.
 Henk Tijms (2004) Understanding Probability 
 A lively introduction to probability theory for the beginner, Cambridge Univ. Press.
 David Williams (1991) Probability with martingales
 An undergraduate introduction to measure-theoretic probability, Cambridge Univ. Press.

External links
 
 Animation demonstrating probability space of dice
 Virtual Laboratories in Probability and Statistics (principal author Kyle Siegrist), especially, Probability Spaces
 Citizendium
 Complete probability space
 

Experiment (probability theory)
Space (mathematics)